The Mexican Handball Federation (FMHB) is the administrative and controlling body for handball and beach handball in United Mexican States. FMHB is a member of the North America and Caribbean Handball Confederation (NACHC) and member of the International Handball Federation (IHF) since 1970.

National teams
 Mexico men's national handball team
 Mexico men's national junior handball team
 Mexico women's national handball team
 Mexico national beach handball team
 Mexico women's national beach handball team

Competitions hosted
 1980 Pan American Men's Handball Championship
 2011 Pan American Games
 2014 Nor.Ca. Men's Handball Championship
 2018 Nor.Ca. Men's Handball Championship
 2019 Nor.Ca. Women's Handball Championship

References

External links
 Mexico at the IHF website.
 Mexico at the NACHC website.

Sports organizations established in 1970
1970 establishments in Mexico
Handball governing bodies
Handball in Mexico
Sports governing bodies in Mexico
North America and Caribbean Handball Confederation members
National members of the International Handball Federation
Organizations based in Mexico City